Elliott Vaughan Spiers (12 October 1973 – 15 January 1994) was an English actor. He appeared in an episode of Jim Henson's television series The Storyteller, "The Heartless Giant", and in two films, Paperhouse (1988) and Taxandria (1994).

Taxandria was filmed in 1989, but was not released until 1994 due to lengthy post-production. During that period, Spiers suffered a negative reaction to an anti-malaria medication that left him gravely ill. He never recovered, and died at the Royal Free Hospital in London in 1994, prior to Taxandria's release. The film was dedicated to his memory at the screening in autumn 1994 in the Flanders Film Festival.

References

1973 births
1994 deaths
English male television actors
English male film actors
20th-century English male actors